Takafumi Yamashita (山下敬史), born November 11, 1987, is a Japanese professional ice hockey Defenceman currently playing for the Oji Eagles of the Asia League.

Since 2006 (the beginning of his professional career), he plays for the Oji Eagles. He also has played for the senior Japan national team since 2010.

References

Oji Eagle's players profile

1987 births
People from Tomakomai, Hokkaido
Japanese ice hockey defencemen
Living people
Oji Eagles players
Sportspeople from Hokkaido
Asian Games silver medalists for Japan
Asian Games bronze medalists for Japan
Medalists at the 2011 Asian Winter Games
Medalists at the 2017 Asian Winter Games
21st-century Japanese politicians
Ice hockey players at the 2011 Asian Winter Games
Ice hockey players at the 2017 Asian Winter Games
Asian Games medalists in ice hockey